María Josefa García Granados y Zavala (10 July 1796 - 28 July 1848) was a Guatemalan intellectual, writer, journalist and poet of Spanish origin, and one of the greatest intellectual exponents of the independence of Guatemala in 1821. She was also a feminist ahead of her time, who with her strong and dominant character prevailed in Guatemalan society. She was the sister of General Miguel García Granados, who was the first liberal president of Guatemala, and Adelaida García Granados, who was tutor of Petrona Álvarez, wife of General Rafael Carrera, lifelong conservative president of Guatemala. As his family was part of the Aycinena clan, they suffered exile and dispossession of their property by Francisco Morazán in 1829.

Biography 

María Josefa García Granados was born in El Puerto de Santa María, Spain. She came from an aristocratic family who had traveled to Spain, but decided to return to Guatemala, after the French invasion of the Iberian Peninsula. Her penchant for literature and journalism led her to participate in gatherings, get to know intellectuals and writers and even publish book of different genres. She was the sister of Miguel García Granados and Adelaida García Granados. Best known to her friends and acquaintances as "Pepita", she married Ramón Saborio de la Villa from Nicaragua, with whom she shared marriage until death and bore him six children. She was known for her strong character and authority; because of this, María Josefa had friendships with the most influential men of her time, even before 1821 she was attending famous gatherings at the home of José María Castilla, a priest born in Madrid, Spain.

Her brother was also her son-in-law, for it was customary at that time that among upper-class families, there were intermarriages; her brother Miguel married her eldest daughter, Cristina.

Works 

About her literature, Ana María Urruela de Quezada -member of the Guatemalan Language Academy- said that "her literary body of work is historically significant , because her portraits, satirical pieces, and letters were able to portray, without romanticisms those characters and episodes related to the cultural and political elite of that forgone era". To García Granados, poetry was an instrument that she used to leave behind live testimonials of that turbulent time of bitter rivalry between the liberal criollos led by Francisco Morazán and the peasant revolts led by Rafael Carrera and unwillingly supported by the conservative criollos. Poetry allowed her to talk about love and romantic topics, while at the same time, she was able to talk about certain symbolic elements.

Rubén Darío in 1887 declared her "the most ingenious woman Central America has produced."

Poetry 

She also wrote and read poetry; among her works are: A la ceiba de Amatitlán, Hymn to the Moon (1830), The Resolution, To a Beautiful Girl -- Unfortunately Engaged to an Old Man, To a Bee, Plegaria, and Farewell.  She also translated some of Byron's verses and worked on historic poetry.

Cien veces una (A hundred times one)

During Dr. Mariano Galvez tenure as head of the Guatemalan State, some liberals in El Salvador wrote in a newspaper called Ten times ten; in turn, García Granados and her friend José Batres Montúfar created a newspaper called A hundred times one (Cien Veces Una).

Death 

According to what is said by textbooks and critics, there is a legend about Josefa and Montufar's death:  both were firm believer in life after death and therefore, they made a pact and agreed that the first one to die would come back and tell whoever was left behind whether there was or not a hell.  Allegedly, they made the pact in 1844, a few months before Batres died.  It has been said that Batres did come back and told María Josefa: "There is indeed a hell, Pepita!"  This would explain why she quit writing in her latest years and withdrew from social life, living instead a very pious life.

She died four years later, on 28 September 1848. Curiously, she was buried in a tomb separated only by a wall to that of Ignacio Gómez, bitter enemy of García Granados in life.

Additional information 

 She was a personal friend of Pedro Molina, José Francisco Barrundia, Dieguez, José Cecilio del Valle, Mariano Gálvez, Cordova, several Aycinena clan members, José Milla y Vidaurre and Rafael Carrera.
 She was aunt -and also grandmother- of María García Granados y Saborío, whom the famous Cuban poet José Martí immortalized in his poem of 1891: La Niña de Guatemala. Because of their similar name, they are often confused, but her niece, although educated, did not have the intellectual capacity of María Josefa.

See also

 Justo Rufino Barrios
 Miguel Garcia Granados

Notes and references

References

Bibliography

Further reading 

 
 
 

1796 births
1848 deaths
Guatemalan women writers
19th-century Guatemalan poets
Guatemalan women poets
Guatemalan journalists
Guatemalan women journalists
19th-century Guatemalan writers
Members of the Aycinena family in Central America
19th-century women writers